Good health may refer to:

Good Health, an album by Pretty Girls Make Graves.
Good Health, an ATV / Central Television schools TV series
Our Lady of Good Health, an apparition of Mary in India. 
Basilica of Our Lady of Good Health, a basilica in India.
Holy Infant of Good Health, a statue said to possess miraculous powers.
a phrase uttered during a toast.
To Your Good Health!, a Russian fairytale.